Alexander Frank Beard (born 1967) is a British billionaire businessman, based in London. He is Chairman and founding shareholder of Adaptogen Capital, a London-based infrastructure firm  and a key player in the energy transition space. Established in 2020, the firm is focused on building a portfolio of storage batteries across the UK that will provide stability to the grid and crucial storage capacity as the UK Grid increases the share of renewable energy power generation.

He is also a sponsor in Energy Transition Partners (ENTP), a Special Purpose Acquisition Company, created with the objective of acquiring a business operating in the energy transition sector.

Alex Beard was formerly CEO of Glencore's worldwide oil operations, one of the world's largest commodity trading and mining companies. In June 2019, it was announced he would retire after 24 years with the company.

Early life
Alex Beard attended Gravesend Grammar School for Boys between 1980 and 1985. He studied at Christ Church, Oxford University in 1985 and graduated with an MA (Hons) in Biochemistry in 1989.

Career 
Beard joined BP as a graduate and worked there as an oil trader from 1990–94. He joined Glencore in 1995 as a trader in Russia and FSU and took over responsibility for all trading in those areas. In 2007, he was appointed as CEO of Glencore’s worldwide oil department.

During his tenure Glencore substantially increased their global business to trade over 5Mb per day of crude and products. Beard also created the RussNeft joint venture for production in Russia as well as  invested in shipping, refining and storage assets. 

In June 2019, it was announced Beard would step down as the head of Glencore's oil division.

According to Forbes, he is worth $2.3 billion.

His new investment fund, Adaptogen Capital is focused on building a portfolio of at least 800MW of strategic storage batteries across the UK to provide stability for the UK grid as the  supply of renewable energy increases. Other ventures include being a Sponsor of Energy Transition Partners (ENTP), a  Special Purpose Acquisition Company, created with the purpose of acquiring a business operating in the energy transition sector.

Personal life
Alex Beard is married, has three children and lives in London.

Alex Beard endowed a £6m  fund at Christ Church which funds income support for undergraduates as part of the Oxford University Bursary Scheme and was made an honorary student of Christ Church in 2012. He was also a major donor to the Royal Marsden Oak Cancer Centre. He joined the Board of Trustees for Shakespeare's Globe in London in 2017, becoming Deputy Chairman in 2019 before stepping down in 2022.

References 

British business executives
British billionaires
Living people
Alumni of Christ Church, Oxford
1967 births
Businesspeople from London
Alumni of the University of Oxford
Glencore people